Matsonford station is a SEPTA rapid transit station in Lower Merion Township, Pennsylvania. It serves the Norristown High Speed Line (Route 100) and is located at Matsonford Road and Montgomery Avenue (PA 320). Local, Hughes Park Express, and Norristown Express trains all stop at Matsonford. The station lies 9.4 track miles from 69th Street Terminal. There is off-street parking available at this station, over the southwest corner of Matsonford & Montgomery. The tracks run above the southeast corner and bridges can be found over both streets. Until October 1995, the station was named Conshohocken Road.

Station layout

References

External links

 Montgomery Avenue entrance from Google Maps Street View

SEPTA Norristown High Speed Line stations